The November 2019 Spanish general election was held on Sunday, 10 November 2019, to elect the 14th Cortes Generales of the Kingdom of Spain. All 350 seats in the Congress of Deputies were up for election, as well as 208 of 265 seats in the Senate.

The election was held as provided under article 99.5 of the Spanish Constitution, as a result of the failure in government formation negotiations between the Spanish Socialist Workers' Party (PSOE) and Unidas Podemos following Pedro Sánchez's failed investiture voting on 23–25 July 2019. On 17 September 2019, King Felipe VI declined to propose any candidate for investiture ahead of the 23 September deadline as a result of the lack of agreement between parties, with a new general election scheduled for 10 November. The failure in negotiations prompted Podemos founder Íñigo Errejón to turn his regional Más Madrid platform—which had obtained a remarkable result in the 26 May Madrilenian regional election—into a national alliance under the newly-created brand of Más País, comprising a number of regional parties and former Podemos and United Left (IU) allies, such as Coalició Compromís, Equo or Chunta Aragonesista (CHA), while also seeing an exodus of a number of Podemos officials into Errejón's new party.

Voter turnout was the lowest since the transition to democracy in 1975, with just 66.2% of the electorate casting a ballot, which was lower than the previous negative record set in the 2016 election (66.5%), the only other occasion in Spanish democracy that an election was triggered as a result of the failure of a government formation process. The election saw a partial recovery for the People's Party (PP) and large gains for the far-right Vox party at the expense of Citizens (Cs), which suffered one of the largest electoral setbacks in the history of Spanish elections following the party scoring its best historical result in the April 2019 general election, signalling the end of Albert Rivera's active political career. Both PSOE and Unidas Podemos saw slight decreases in both popular vote and seats, but were still able to outperform the combined strength of PP, Vox and Cs; consequently, both parties agreed to set aside their political feuds and successfully negotiated a government shortly after the election, to become the first governing coalition in Spain since the Second Spanish Republic.

The tenure of the newly-formed government, which was formally appointed on 13 January 2020, would be quickly overshadowed by the outbreak of the COVID-19 pandemic in March and its political and economical consequences, including the worst worldwide recession since the Great Depression resulting from the massive lockdowns enforced to reduce the spread of SARS-CoV-2.

Overview

Electoral system
The Spanish Cortes Generales were envisaged as an imperfect bicameral system. The Congress of Deputies had greater legislative power than the Senate, having the ability to vote confidence in or withdraw it from a prime minister and to override Senate vetoes by an absolute majority of votes. Nonetheless, the Senate possessed a few exclusive (yet limited in number) functions—such as its role in constitutional amendment—which were not subject to the Congress' override. Voting for the Cortes Generales was on the basis of universal suffrage, which comprised all nationals over 18 years of age and in full enjoyment of their political rights. Additionally, Spaniards abroad were required to apply for voting before being permitted to vote, a system known as "begged" or expat vote.

For the Congress of Deputies, 348 seats were elected using the D'Hondt method and a closed list proportional representation, with an electoral threshold of three percent of valid votes—which included blank ballots—being applied in each constituency. Seats were allocated to constituencies, corresponding to the provinces of Spain, with each being allocated an initial minimum of two seats and the remaining 248 being distributed in proportion to their populations. Ceuta and Melilla were allocated the two remaining seats, which were elected using plurality voting. The use of the D'Hondt method might result in a higher effective threshold, depending on the district magnitude.

As a result of the aforementioned allocation, each Congress multi-member constituency was entitled the following seats:

For the Senate, 208 seats were elected using an open list partial block voting system, with electors voting for individual candidates instead of parties. In constituencies electing four seats, electors could vote for up to three candidates; in those with two or three seats, for up to two candidates; and for one candidate in single-member districts. Each of the 47 peninsular provinces was allocated four seats, whereas for insular provinces, such as the Balearic and Canary Islands, districts were the islands themselves, with the larger—Majorca, Gran Canaria and Tenerife—being allocated three seats each, and the smaller—Menorca, Ibiza–Formentera, Fuerteventura, La Gomera, El Hierro, Lanzarote and La Palma—one each. Ceuta and Melilla elected two seats each. Additionally, autonomous communities could appoint at least one senator each and were entitled to one additional senator per each million inhabitants.

Election date
The term of each chamber of the Cortes Generales—the Congress and the Senate—expired four years from the date of their previous election, unless they were dissolved earlier. The election decree was required to be issued no later than the twenty-fifth day prior to the date of expiry of the Cortes in the event that the prime minister did not make use of his prerogative of early dissolution. The decree was to be published on the following day in the Official State Gazette (BOE), with election day taking place on the fifty-fourth day from publication. The previous election was held on 28 April 2019, which meant that the legislature's term would have expired on 28 April 2023. The election decree was required to be published in the BOE no later than 4 April 2023, with the election taking place on the fifty-fourth day from publication, setting the latest possible election date for the Cortes Generales on Sunday, 28 May 2023.

The prime minister had the prerogative to dissolve both chambers at any given time—either jointly or separately—and call a snap election, provided that no motion of no confidence was in process, no state of emergency was in force and that dissolution did not occur before one year had elapsed since the previous one. Additionally, both chambers were to be dissolved and a new election called if an investiture process failed to elect a prime minister within a two-month period from the first ballot. Barred this exception, there was no constitutional requirement for simultaneous elections for the Congress and the Senate. Still, as of  there has been no precedent of separate elections taking place under the 1978 Constitution.

Parliamentary composition
The Cortes Generales were officially dissolved on 24 September 2019, after the publication of the dissolution decree in the Official State Gazette. The tables below show the composition of the parliamentary groups in both chambers at the time of dissolution.

Parties and candidates
The electoral law allowed for parties and federations registered in the interior ministry, coalitions and groupings of electors to present lists of candidates. Parties and federations intending to form a coalition ahead of an election were required to inform the relevant Electoral Commission within ten days of the election call, whereas groupings of electors needed to secure the signature of at least one percent of the electorate in the constituencies for which they sought election, disallowing electors from signing for more than one list of candidates. Concurrently, parties, federations or coalitions that had not obtained a mandate in either chamber of the Cortes at the preceding election were required to secure the signature of at least 0.1 percent of electors in the aforementioned constituencies. The electoral law provided for a special, simplified process for election re-runs, including a shortening of deadlines, the lifting of signature requirements if these had been already met for the immediately previous election and the possibility of maintaining lists and coalitions without needing to go through pre-election procedures again.

Below is a list of the main parties and electoral alliances which contested the election:

Timetable
The November 2019 Spanish general election was the first to apply the new electoral procedures introduced for election re-runs as a result of the experience of the 2015–2016 political deadlock leading to the June 2016 election. This consists of a special, simplified process, including a shortening of deadlines, the lifting of signature requirements if these had been already met for the immediately previous election and the possibility of maintaining lists and coalitions without needing to go through the same pre-election procedures again. The key dates are listed below (all times are CET. Note that the Canary Islands use WET (UTC+0) instead):

24 September: The election decree is issued with the countersign of the President of the Congress of Deputies, ratified by the King. Formal dissolution of the Cortes Generales and beginning of a suspension period of events for the inauguration of public works, services or projects.
25 September: Initial constitution of provincial and zone electoral commissions.
30 September: Deadline for parties and federations intending to maintain or enter into a coalition to inform the relevant electoral commission.
7 October: Deadline for parties, federations, coalitions, and groupings of electors to maintain or present lists of candidates to the relevant electoral commission.
9 October: Submitted lists of candidates are provisionally published in the Official State Gazette (BOE).
13 October: Deadline for parties, federations, coalitions, and groupings of electors to rectify irregularities in their lists.
14 October: Official proclamation of valid submitted lists of candidates.
15 October: Proclaimed lists are published in the BOE.
19 October: Deadline for citizens entered in the Register of Absent Electors Residing Abroad (CERA) and for citizens temporarily absent from Spain to apply for voting.
31 October: Deadline to apply for postal voting.
1 November: Official start of electoral campaigning.
5 November: Official start of legal ban on electoral opinion polling publication, dissemination or reproduction and deadline for CERA citizens to vote by mail.
6 November: Deadline for postal and temporarily absent voters to issue their votes .
8 November: Last day of official electoral campaigning and deadline for CERA citizens to vote in a ballot box in the relevant consular office or division.
9 November: Official 24-hour ban on political campaigning prior to the general election (reflection day).
10 November: Polling day (polling stations open at 9 am and close at 8 pm or once voters present in a queue at/outside the polling station at 8 pm have cast their vote). Provisional counting of votes starts immediately.
13 November: General counting of votes, including the counting of CERA votes.
16 November: Deadline for the general counting of votes to be carried out by the relevant electoral commission.
25 November: Deadline for elected members to be proclaimed by the relevant electoral commission.
5 December: Deadline for both chambers of the Cortes Generales to be re-assembled (the election decree determines this date, which for the November 2019 election was set for 3 December).
4 January: Final deadline for definitive results to be published in the BOE.

Campaign

Party slogans

Pre-campaign period
The pre-campaign period saw the rise of a new left-wing electoral platform, Más País, founded by former Podemos co-founder Íñigo Errejón around his Más Madrid platform, following the failure of the left to agree on a government following the April election. Más País was joined by several other parties, such as Coalició Compromís, Chunta Aragonesista and Equo, the latter of which voted for breaking up its coalition with Unidas Podemos in order to join Errejón's platform. The leadership of Podemos in the Region of Murcia also went on to joint Más País. The platform went on to poll at 6% as soon as it was formed.

On 24 September, the Spanish Supreme Court ruled in favor of the PSOE's plan to remove the remnants of Francisco Franco from the Valle de los Caídos, a key policy of Pedro Sánchez during the previous legislature. The prior of the Valle de los Caídos' abbey, Santiago Cantera, initially announced his intention to disregard the Supreme Court's ruling and not authorize Franco's exhumation; however, the Spanish government closed down the monument to the public on 11 October in order to prepare for the exhumationfinally scheduled for 22 October at latest, so for the removal to be over by 25 Octoberto uphold the Supreme Court's ruling.

On 13 October, the leaders of the Catalan independence movement involved in the events of October 2017 were sentenced by the Supreme Court for sedition and embezzlement to convictions ranging from 9 to 13 years in jail. The ruling unleashed a wave of violent protests throughout Catalonia, and particularly in Barcelona, throughout the ensuing days.

Election debates

Opinion polls

Opinion polls

Voter turnout
The table below shows registered vote turnout on election day without including voters from the Census of Absent-Residents (CERA).

Results

Congress of Deputies

Senate

Aftermath
On 11 November, the day after the election, Albert Rivera resigned as leader of Citizens (Cs) after the party lost over 80% of its seats in the Congress and one-third of its seats in the Senate (mainly to Vox and the PP), and announced his intention to give up the Congress seat to which he had been elected, and retire from politics entirely. The PP recovered around one-third of the seats it had lost in the Congress in the April 2019 election, and almost half of the Senate seats it had lost on that occasion. The right-wing nationalist Vox party saw its seats in the Congress more than double, and it won its first directly elected Senate seats. Más País gained two seats in the Congress from Madrid (one from the PSOE and one from Podemos), while the leftist and Catalan nationalist Popular Unity Candidacy (CUP) gained its first seats in the national legislature after choosing to participate at the national level for the first time.

Government formation

On 7 January 2020, Pedro Sánchez was confirmed as prime minister by the Congress of Deputies.

2020 motion of no confidence

Notes

References

General elections in Spain
General election
November General